The 2021–22 Penn State Nittany Lions men's ice hockey season was the 16th season of play for the program. They represented Penn State University in the 2021–22 NCAA Division I men's ice hockey season. This season marked the ninth season in the Big Ten Conference. They were coached by Guy Gadowsky, in his 11th season, and played their home games at Pegula Ice Arena.

Season
Penn State's season began with a bang and the Nittany Lions won six of their first seven games, culminating with a win over North Dakota at the Bridgestone Arena, the home of the Nashville Predators. The hot start got PSU its first ranking of the season but their circumstances quickly changed. As soon as they began their conference schedule, Penn State lost four game in a row with both their offense and defense crumbling. They recovered a bit at the end of November but the respite didn't last long and the Nittany Lions finished the first half of their season near the bottom of the Big Ten standings.

After a win over Army to kick off their second half, Penn State lost four consecutive game again and were wallowing at the bottom of their conference. Oskar Autio hadn't been playing well in goal and the team began to move away from his as the primary starter. Liam Soulière began sharing the load in goal and the team got a boost at the end of January when they made their only conference weekend sweep of the year. The offense then failed afterwards and Penn State lost another 5 games in a row before managing a split with Big Ten bottom-feeder Michigan State to close out the regular season.

The team's terrible season was supposed to end quickly against Ohio State, who were gearing up for the NCAA tournament. Instead of surrendering to expectations, the Lions fought hard against the Buckeyes; after losing the first game by just a goal, the offense bombarded the OSU cage with 81 shots in two games. Soulière held back the counterattack just enough to earn two 1-goal wins and Penn State knocked out #12 team in the country. The Lions were nearly able to pull off a stunning comeback the following game when they tied Minnesota after being down 0–2, but a late goal from the Gophers ultimately ended their season.

Departures

Recruiting

Roster
As of September 5, 2021.

Standings

Schedule and results

|-
!colspan=12 style=";" | Regular Season

|-
!colspan=12 style=";" |

Scoring statistics

Goaltending statistics

Rankings

Note: USCHO did not release a poll in week 24.

References

External links

2021–22
Penn State Nittany Lions
Penn State Nittany Lions
2021 in sports in Pennsylvania
2022 in sports in Pennsylvania